Jie Wu (Chinese: 吴杰; Pinyin: Wú Jié) is a Chinese computer scientist. He is the Associate Vice Provost for International Affairs and Director for Center for Networked Computing at Temple University. He also serves as the Laura H. Carnell professor in the Department of Computer and Information Sciences. He served as Program Director of Networking Technology and Systems (NeTS) at the National Science Foundation from 2006 to 2008.

Jie Wu is noted for his research in routing for wired and wireless networks. His main technical contributions include fault-tolerant routing in hypercube-based multiprocessors, local construction of connected dominating set and its applications in mobile ad hoc networks, and efficient routing in delay tolerant networks, including social contact networks.

He served as the General Chair of IEEE ICDCS 2013, IEEE IPDPS 2008, and IEEE MASS 2006 and the Program Chair of CCF CNCC 2013, IEEE INFOCOM 2011, and IEEE MASS 2004. He is a Fellow of IEEE and serves on the editorial board for a number of journals, including IEEE Transactions on Computers (TC), IEEE Transactions on Services Computing (TSC), and Journal of Parallel and Distributed Computing (JPDC).

He received 2011 China Computer Federation (CCF) Overseas Outstanding Achievements Award. He was a Fulbright Senior Specialist. He was also an IEEE Distinguished Visitor and an ACM Distinguished Speaker and is currently a CCF Distinguished Speaker.

He resides in Fort Washington, Pennsylvania.

References

External links
 at the Temple University.
NSF contact information of Jie Wu.

Living people
Temple University faculty
Educators from Shanghai
Year of birth missing (living people)